Blythe Byte is an album by the saxophonist Arthur Blythe, recorded in 2001 and released on the Savant label.

Reception

In his review on AllMusic, arwulf arwulf called it "a well-balanced assortment". In JazzTimes, Bill Bennett wrote: "Working here in (and out of) a quartet setting, Blythe dances deftly between what we know and what he wants to show us".

Track listing 
All compositions by Arthur Blythe except where noted
 "Hardly" – 7:29
 "Besame Mucho" (Consuelo Velázquez, Sunny Skylar) – 5:47
 "Blue Monk" (Thelonious Monk) – 6:09
 "Light Blue" (Monk) – 5:02
 "And One" (Dwayne Dolphin) – 6:23
 "My Little Brown Book" (Billy Strayhorn) – 6:15
 "Naima" (John Coltrane) – 6:11
 "Ruby, My Dear" (Monk) – 6:00
 "Blythe Byte" – 0:43
 "What a Friend We Have in Jesus" (Joseph Scriven, Charles Crozat Converse) – 4:29

Personnel 
Arthur Blythe – alto saxophone
John Hicks – piano (tracks 1-8 & 10)
Dwayne Dolphin – bass (tracks 1-3 & 5-7)
Cecil Brooks III – drums (tracks 1-3 & 5-7)

References 

Arthur Blythe albums
2001 albums
Savant Records albums